Estádio Engenheiro Alencar Araripe or Arena Unimed Sicoob (for sponsorship reasons) is a stadium in Cariacica, Espírito Santo, Brazil. It has a capacity of 7,700 spectators. It is the home of Desportiva Ferroviária.

2014 World Cup
The stadium was used by the Australia national team to train before and during the 2014 World Cup.

References

Football venues in Espírito Santo
Estadio Engenheiro Alencar Araripe